= Nausikleia =

Coastal town of ancient Bithynia

Coordinates: 41°04′41″N 29°03′56″E

Nausikleia was a coastal town of ancient Bithynia located on the Bosphorus.

Its site is located at mouth of the Küçüksu in Asiatic Turkey.
